Sydney Irving, Baron Irving of Dartford PC (1 July 1918 – 18 December 1989) was a British Labour Co-operative politician.

Irving was educated at Pendower School, Newcastle-upon-Tyne and the London School of Economics. He was a school teacher and lecturer and served as an alderman on Dartford Borough Council.

Irving was twice Member of Parliament for Dartford, originally elected in 1955. In Harold Wilson's Labour Government 1964-1970, he was the government's Deputy Chief Whip and Treasurer of the Household from 1964 to 1966, and served as a Deputy Speaker of the House of Commons from 1966 to 1970, when he lost his seat to the Conservatives. He was re-elected in 1974, but lost the seat again in 1979, to the Conservative Bob Dunn.  Subsequently, on 10 July 1979, Irving was created a life peer as Baron Irving of Dartford, of Dartford in the County of Kent.

References

 Times Guide to the House of Commons 1979

External links 
 

1918 births
1989 deaths
Labour Co-operative MPs for English constituencies
Deputy Speakers of the British House of Commons
Alumni of the London School of Economics
Members of the Privy Council of the United Kingdom
UK MPs 1955–1959
UK MPs 1959–1964
UK MPs 1964–1966
UK MPs 1966–1970
UK MPs 1974
UK MPs 1974–1979
Treasurers of the Household
Irving of Dartford
Councillors in Kent
Ministers in the Wilson governments, 1964–1970
Life peers created by Elizabeth II